Vũ Hoàng đế or Emperor Vũ may refer to:

Lê Trung Tông (Revival Lê dynasty) (1535–1556), Later Lê emperor
Nguyễn Phúc Khoát (1714–1765), Nguyễn lord, posthumously honored as an emperor
Quang Trung (1753–1792), emperor of the Tây Sơn dynasty

See also
Emperor Wu (disambiguation)